Jan Harvey (born 1 June 1947) is a British actress. She is known for her regular television roles in Howards' Way (1985–1990), Bugs (1997–1999), and Family Affairs (2003–2005).

Career
Harvey is best known as Jan Howard in the BBC television drama series Howards' Way from 1985 to 1990. The character ran a fashion boutique named Periplus. The boutique specialised in the sale of après sail wear (and was also the first UK headquarters of the German mail order franchise, Die Spitz). Subsequently, a partnership, Howard Brooke, was formed which ran multiple boutiques as well as producing its own designs. There followed the launch of an internationally renowned couture house (with attendant fragrance and cosmetics lines), the House of Howard, which was successfully floated on the stock exchange.

During the 1990s Harvey appeared in the action series Bugs, and later she was a regular cast member in the Channel 5 soap opera Family Affairs (in which she played Babs Woods). She has also guest-starred in many other high-profile British dramas, including A Touch of Frost, Inspector Morse, New Tricks and Lovejoy.

Harvey appeared in the 2010 UK tour of Calendar Girls and was due to appear in a second run of the show in late 2011.

From March 2015 to July 2016, Harvey appeared in the BBC soap opera EastEnders, as Margaret Midhurst, the family solicitor, and aunt of Sharon Watts (Letitia Dean). Her character was killed off when her on-screen brother, Gavin Sullivan (Paul Nicholas), pushed her over a balcony during a scuffle.

Filmography

Television

References

External links

Jan Harvey Interview at Best British TV

1947 births
English television actresses
Living people
People from Penzance
English soap opera actresses